MudRunner (formerly Spintires: MudRunner) is a 2017 off-roading simulation game developed by Saber Interactive and published by Focus Home Interactive. It was released on October 31, 2017 for Microsoft Windows, PlayStation 4, and Xbox One and is a spin-off/sequel of the 2014 Windows-exclusive Spintires, which was developed by Oovee Game Studios. It was later added to the Xbox Game Pass in December 2018. Similar to Spintires, MudRunner has the player control off-road vehicles as they traverse locations to complete objectives. The game was released in Japan on Nintendo Switch on June 18, 2020. A sequel to MudRunner was released on April 28, 2020 titled SnowRunner.

Gameplay 
MudRunner is an all-terrain simulation video game which tasks driving through muddy unpaved roads in aging Soviet vehicles with nothing but a map and a compass. The aim of the game is to transport logs to their destination without depleting resources (such as fuel) or damaging the vehicle. There is both a single-player and multiplayer co-op mode that both use the same main six maps.

The game has a challenge mode that presents nine small maps each based around a specific gameplay function meant to teach the player the different aspects of the game. Each level also has three bonus objectives which can be completed to earn achievements; they offer no in-game rewards.

Post-release content
The game has an expansion, American Wilds, which features American automobiles instead of Soviet. It also bundled with the base game and release on console as an ultimate edition of the game.

Reception 

On review aggregation site Metacritic, MudRunner has aggregate scores of 67 and 72 for the PlayStation 4 and Xbox One versions of the game respectively, indicating "mixed or average reviews", and a score of 77 for the PC version, indicating "generally favorable reviews". Nintendo Life gave the Nintendo Switch version of the game a 7/10, praising the quality port to the Switch and the lush environments of the American Wilds DLC included with the game, while criticizing "frustrating design faults" from the previous version, such as the lack of an automatic navigation system.

References

External links
 

2017 video games
Android (operating system) games
Cooperative video games
Focus Entertainment games
IOS games
Nintendo Switch games
Off-road racing video games
Off-roading
Open-world video games
PlayStation 4 games
Saber Interactive games
Single-player video games
Video games with Steam Workshop support
Truck racing video games
Vehicle simulation games
Video games developed in the United States
Windows games
Xbox One games